Golden slippers may refer to:

 Deciduous hoof capsule, a covering on the hooves of newborn foals, sometimes called "golden slippers"
 Golden Slippers, a spiritual popularised after the American Civil War
 Oh, Dem Golden Slippers, a United States minstrel song
 Paphiopedilum armeniacum, the "golden slipper orchid"